Yohann Gène (born 25 June 1981 in Pointe-à-Pitre, Guadeloupe) is a French former professional road bicycle racer, who competed professionally between 2005 and 2019, entirely for  and its later iterations. He was the first cyclist of Afro-Caribbean and Sub-Saharan African descent to ever compete in the Tour de France.

Major results

2003
 2nd La Côte Picarde
 9th Overall Tour de la Somme
2004
 6th Grand Prix des Marbriers
2007
 5th Grand Prix de la Somme
2009
 1st Stage 7 Tour de Langkawi
2010
 2nd Val d'Ille Classic
 5th Overall La Tropicale Amissa Bongo
1st Stage 5
2011
 1st Stage 3 Tour of South Africa
 7th Boucles de l'Aulne
 9th Overall La Tropicale Amissa Bongo
1st Stages 2 & 5
2012
 3rd Châteauroux Classic
 5th Overall La Tropicale Amissa Bongo
1st  Points classification
1st Stages 1 & 5
 10th Tallinn–Tartu GP
2013
 1st  Overall La Tropicale Amissa Bongo
1st  Points classification
1st Stage 6
 1st Stage 2 Route du Sud
2014
 1st Stage 3 Boucles de la Mayenne
 7th Grand Prix de Fourmies
2015
 1st  Points classification La Tropicale Amissa Bongo
2016
 6th Tro-Bro Léon
2017 
 1st  Overall La Tropicale Amissa Bongo
1st Stage 5

Grand Tour general classification results timeline

References

External links 

 

French male cyclists
Guadeloupean male cyclists
Tour de Guadeloupe cyclists
French people of Guadeloupean descent
1981 births
Living people